Crown of Polish Mountains – a list of 28 peaks one per each of the mountain ranges of Poland. It was suggested by geographer, traveller and writer  and dr Wojciech Lewandowski in the tourism and local lore magazine .

The original idea was to be a list containing the highest peak of each range. However it was decided to consider only most prominent peaks which had a marked hiking trail at the time of the compiling of the list. In addition, the authors made several significant mistakes in the selection of peaks, e.g. by omitting some mountain ranges in the rank of a mesoregion, and placing others in the rank of a microregion. According to the new physical and geographical regionalization of Poland published in 2018, there are more peaks in the Crown, e.g. the Tatra Mountains in Poland consist of three mesoregions: the Reglowe Tatras, the Western Tatras and the High Tatras.

Peaks

See also
 List of mountains in Poland
 Seven Summits is called literally "Crown of the Earth" in Polish

Further reading
Krzysztof Bzowski, Korona Polskich Gór, 2016, 184pp.

External links
 Official Site

Mountains of Poland